Francesco Molinari-Pradelli (born 4 July 1911 Bologna; died 8 August 1996 Bologna) was a prominent Italian opera conductor.  He studied piano and composition at Bologna, and graduated from the Accademia di Santa Cecilia, Rome in 1938.  He made his debut at La Scala in 1946 and his Covent Garden debut in 1955.  His account of Puccini's Turandot with Birgit Nilsson and Franco Corelli is commonly regarded as one of the greatest recordings of that work.

Discography

 Giuseppe Verdi: Simon Boccanegra - (Cetra, 1951)
 Friedrich von Flotow: Martha - (Cetra, 1953)
 Jules Massenet: Werther - (Cetra, 1953)
 Giuseppe Verdi: La traviata - (Decca, 1954)
 Giacomo Puccini: Manon Lescaut - (Decca, 1954)
 Gaetano Donizetti: L'elisir d'amore - (Decca, 1955)
 Giuseppe Verdi: La forza del destino - (Decca, 1955)
 Giacomo Puccini: Tosca - (Decca, 1959)
 The Art of the Prima Donna: "Joan Sutherland" - (Decca, 1960)
 Giacomo Puccini: Turandot - (EMI, 1965)
 Giacomo Puccini: La rondine - (RCA, 1966)

References

External links
 Francesco Molinari-Pradelli – All Music Guide to Classical Music

1911 births
1996 deaths
Musicians from Bologna
Italian male conductors (music)
Accademia Nazionale di Santa Cecilia alumni
20th-century Italian conductors (music)
20th-century Italian male musicians